Eduard Šimun (born December 27, 1994) is a Slovak professional ice hockey player currently playing for HC 21 Prešov of the Slovak Extraliga.

Šimun made his Slovak Extraliga debut playing with HC ’05 Banská Bystrica during the 2012–13 Slovak Extraliga season. He has also played for HK Dukla Trenčín and HC Nové Zámky as well for HC Dynamo Pardubice of the Czech Extraliga and HC Slovan Bratislava of the Kontinental Hockey League.

Career statistics

Regular season and playoffs

International

References

External links
 

1994 births
Living people
Slovak ice hockey centres
HC '05 Banská Bystrica players
HK Dukla Trenčín players
HC Dynamo Pardubice players
HC Nové Zámky players
HK Dukla Michalovce players
Sioux Falls Stampede players
HC Slovan Bratislava players
HK Nitra players
Hokej Šumperk 2003 players
HC 21 Prešov players
Sportspeople from Topoľčany
Slovak expatriate ice hockey players in the United States
Slovak expatriate ice hockey players in Sweden
Slovak expatriate ice hockey players in the Czech Republic